Chongqing railway station is a railway station of Chengyu Railway, Xiangyu Railway, Chuanqian Railway, Chengyu Passenger Railway, that located in People's Republic of China. It is a transportation hub of Chongqing in China.

Once the most important railway station in Chongqing, this station handled virtually all long-distance services to the rest of China. Located between central city area and the Yangtze River, the extremely steep terrain of Chongqing requires the longest escalator in Asia between the station to the commercial districts and Lianglukou station of Chongqing Rail Transit Line 1 and Line 3.

Currently the station has been closed for major renovations, in line with construction of the Chengdu–Chongqing Intercity Railway. Until 2015, only the ticket hall will remain open. However it is still also the site of a major bus terminal.

Structure
Chongqing station is a first-class terminus station of the Chengdu-Chongqing Railway, Xiangfan and Sichuan-Guizhou Railway. Due to its unique size and location, the throughput of the station is less than it was 20 years ago (the site is too small, requiring frequent shunting). With the limitations of Chongqing city's unique mountain environment, the station space is very narrow and not be able to further expand the station's capacity. Chongqing station will continue to  maintain the same capacity of the 60-year first-class station. Other stations in Chongqing (such as Chongqing North) have been built, upgraded or being planned to handle the  increased passenger needs of the city.

Station layout

History
In 1950, construction started, using about 1,100 engineers and 3,000 "counter-revolutionary criminals" and other prisoners to participate in the construction of the Chongqing Station by reform through labor.

Chongqing station was opened by Marshal Liu in 1952.

In 1992, the Chengdu Railway Bureau attempted to fill in the river or even build an elevated railway station to increase capacity at Chongqing station. However the existing highway and Caiyuanba interchange hub along the Yangtze River forced them to abandon the construction. This caused the expansion of Shapingba railway station. While in Yubei area away from the main city 17 km outside addition to the construction of the new first-class station in Chongqing North railway station to ease passenger pressure at Chongqing station.

Reconstruction and rehabilitation works commenced in 2012. Chongqing railway station will be the terminus for the high-speed Chengdu–Chongqing Intercity Railway with a riverside park established on the roof.

Metro station
Line 18 and Line 27, currently under construction, will serve the railway station.

See also
Chongqing North railway station
Chongqing West railway station
Shapingba railway station

References

External links

Chongqing Railway Station 

Railway stations in Chongqing
Railway stations in China opened in 1952
1952 establishments in China
Stations on the Chengdu–Chongqing Intercity Railway
Stations on the Chengdu–Chongqing Railway